Purchase price adjustments capture the change in value of an asset typically between the negotiation and closing.

Example
Antonio purchased property from Shylock for $50,000.  At closing, Antonio paid $10,000 to Shylock and executed a promissory note payable to "Shylock or order" for $40,000.  Following the closing, Antonio approached Shylock, upset that the property was in fact worth only $42,000.  After a few weeks of negotiations, the parties agreed to reduce the amount of the promissory note to $32,000.

Federal Tax Implications
A Purchase Price Adjustment is not included as gross income under the U.S. tax code.  The adjustment between the parties is merely re-setting the amount of the purchase price.  Additionally, the price adjustment has to exist between the seller and the buyer (no third parties can be involved).

References

Financial markets